Valdez High School is a high school located in Valdez, Alaska. It is part of the Valdez City Schools District. The school serves students in grades 9 to 12.

Athletics offered include basketball, football, volleyball, wrestling, baseball, cross-country running, swimming, diving, track and field, cheerleading, and cross-country skiing.

Alumni

 Bill Walker- governor of Alaska.

References

External links
 Valdez City School District
 Public Schools Review

Buildings and structures in Chugach Census Area, Alaska
Public high schools in Alaska
Schools in Unorganized Borough, Alaska